Ochagavía or Otsagabia (also Otsagi) is a town and municipality in the province and autonomous community of Navarre, northern Spain. It is situated in the north of the Valley of Salazar, near the Irati Forest and not far from the border with France.

External links
 OCHAGAVIA in the Bernardo Estornés Lasa - Auñamendi Encyclopedia (Euskomedia Fundazioa) 

Municipalities in Navarre